"Man of Devotion" is the first single from the album Ready for the Real Life by German pop band Fools Garden.

Volkswagen used "Man of Devotion" in a commercial for Volkswagen Polo.

Track listing
Man of Devotion (radio version)
Daihaminkay (call this world remix)
Man of Devotion (the rain house demotape)

Original version of "Daihaminkay" on the album Ready for the Real Life.

Musicians
Peter Freudenthaler - vocals
Volker Hinkel - guitar
Gabriel Holz - guitar
Dirk Blümlein - bass
Claus Müller - drums

External links
  (requires flash)

2005 singles
Fools Garden songs
2005 songs